The Rotterdam Metro is a rapid transit system operated in Rotterdam, Netherlands and surrounding municipalities by RET. The first line, called Noord – Zuidlijn (North – South line) opened in 1968 and ran from Centraal Station to Zuidplein, crossing the river Nieuwe Maas in a tunnel. It was the first metro system to open in the Netherlands. At the time it was also one of the shortest metro lines in the world with a length of only .

In 1982 a second line was opened, the Oost – Westlijn (East – West line), running between Capelsebrug and Coolhaven stations. In the late 1990s, the lines were named after two historic Rotterdam citizens, the Erasmus Line (North – South) after Desiderius Erasmus and the Caland Line (East – West) after Pieter Caland. As of December 2009, these names were dropped again in favour of a combination of letters and colours, to emphasise and clarify the difference between the separate branches, especially of the former East – West line.

Lines

Lines A and B
In the northeast of Rotterdam, Lines A and B branch to Binnenhof (Line A) and to Nesselande (Line B). The latter has been extended since September 2005; before that date, this line terminated at De Tochten.

North of Capelsebrug station and west of Schiedam Centrum station, with the exception of the De Tochten-Nesselande section, Lines A and B have some level crossings (with priority), and could therefore be called light rail instead of metro. These sections also have overhead wires, while most of the system has a third rail (the other exception is Line E (RandstadRail) to The Hague). However, the term light rail is not used in Rotterdam; most people just call these branches metro.

As of 30 September 2019 Line B is connected to the Schiedam–Hoek van Holland railway line, extending the metro network to Hook of Holland (Hoek van Holland), while line A will operate on this line as far as Vlaardingen West, starting 1 November 2019.

Line C

At Capelsebrug, Line C branches off the main East-West section to De Terp in Capelle aan den IJssel. Until November 2002, the Calandlijn (now lines A, B and C) terminated in the west of Rotterdam, at Marconiplein. On 4 November 2002 an extension through the city of Schiedam towards Spijkenisse was opened. The extension included four new stations in Schiedam (including Schiedam Centrum station) and one in Pernis. Line C joins Line D at the Tussenwater station in Hoogvliet. Line A and B branch off to the Schiedam-Hoek van Holland railway, while Line C trains continue and, like those on the Line D, terminate at De Akkers station in Spijkenisse.

Line D

Line D runs from Rotterdam Centraal via Beurs, Slinge, Rhoon, Tussenwater, and Spijkenisse Centrum towards De Akkers.

Line D intersects with Lines A, B and C at Beurs station. Before the connection with Line E at Rotterdam Centraal was realized in December 2011, some Line D trains terminated at Slinge during rush hours.

Line E
Line E is a direct conversion of the former Hofpleinlijn from a railway line to a rapid transit line in 2006. The section of the route between Laan van NOI and Leidschendam-Voorburg is shared with light rail vehicles on two routes from the Hague tram network heading towards Zoetermeer via the Zoetermeer Stadslijn. All of these services fall under the RandstadRail branding.

At the time of opening, the old Hofplein station was temporarily kept as the line's southern terminus. On 17 August 2010, however, a new tunnel opened, which connected the metro station at Rotterdam Centraal via a new tunnel and new Blijdorp station with the existing tracks near Melanchthonweg station.

For the next year, work was in progress to connect Line D to Line E at Rotterdam Centraal station. Since the completion of this project in December 2011, all trains coming from Den Haag Centraal terminate at Slinge (these are Line E trains), while line D continues in service between De Akkers and Rotterdam Centraal.

The line's northern terminus used the former railway platforms at Den Haag Centraal, which had been inherited from NS and in use since 1975, having been moved from the previous terminus at Den Haag Hollands Spoor. These platforms remained in use until 12 February 2016. The line was then closed between here and Laan Van NOI while construction was completed of a new station built on an elevated viaduct adjacent to the railway platforms. This opened on 22 August 2016.

Network map

Rolling stock

Trains series 5300, 5400, 5500, 5600 and 5700 are Bombardier Flexity Swifts. The series 5500 trains, made between 2007 and 2009, were built for the new RandstadRail Line E. The 5601-5642 trains were built to replace older Duewag stock (series 5200). In 2013, RET announced that it ordered 16 additional vehicles of SG3 stock to run on the Hoekse Line extension. A further six vehicles were ordered to increase capacity on the Randstadrail branch in 2015. Delivery of these 22 vehicles, called HSG3, took place between 2015 and 2017.

Overview

The Line B extension to Hoek van Holland Strand will open in 2022. In 2015, there were about 175,000 daily riders of Lines A, B and C. There were 145,000 on Lines D and E.

Future extensions

RET plans to build a connecting line from Kralingse Zoom station to the new Feijenoord City housing area, and then on to Zuidplein, Charlois and Rotterdam Central station; along with plans to convert two tracks of four heavy-rail tracks between Rotterdam Central and Dordrecht to metro operation. By adding extra stations and operating trains at two-minute interval RET expects to achieve a significant increase in traffic. Another ambition is to automate the metro to achieve 90-second headways.

Traction power
Trains run on 750 volts DC power which is supplied through a bottom-contact third rail throughout most of the system. There are multiple spring-loaded contact shoes on both sides of the vehicle, which are loaded and unloaded automatically due to the slanted edges of third rail ends. This allows the rail to be installed on either side of the track, a necessity around points and station platforms. There is sufficient overlap between the two rails on either end to avoid a "gapped" train, a situation where none of the shoes are in contact with the live rail. To reduce the risk of electrocution, the rail consists of a sturdy yellow insulating material, with the live current carried on a thick metal strip on the bottom side. This also guards against grime (such as from fallen autumn leaves) reducing or preventing electrical contact.

Three lines do however have sections that use overhead wires. These are lines A (towards Binnenhof), B (towards Nesselande), and E (towards Den Haag Centraal). On lines A and B, trains raise or lower their pantographs while the vehicle is in motion just east of Capelsebrug station, while on line E this happens while stationary at Melanchtonweg station (this leads to the only level crossing with third rail in the country being at the Kleiweg just outside the tunnel heading to Blijdorp station). Note that Line B trains switch back to third rail for the final leg of the journey, from the penultimate station De Tochten to Nesselande. The western extension of lines A and B to Hook of Holland also use overhead power as they are converted directly from the existing railway line.

The sections of the metro that use overhead wires are called sneltram (light rail) by locals, as they include several protected level crossings at street level, which trains pass through with priority, as in a conventional railway line. For this reason, trains with a pantograph (series 5200 and 5400) are equipped with turn signals just like any road vehicle. This makes it easy to see the difference between series 5300 and series 5400 Bombardier-built trains. Series 5500 and 5600 trains are also equipped, although the former is normally used on line E only as they carry the RandstadRail branding and livery while the latter carries that of R-net.

See also 

 List of Rotterdam Metro stations
 RandstadRail
 Trams in Rotterdam
 List of metro systems
 De Akkers metro station crash

References

Further reading

 Jan van Huijksloot and Joachim Kost, Veertig jaar Metro in Rotterdam 1968-2008. Uitgeverij Uquilar, 2008.

External links

  
 Rotterdam Metro Map at UrbanRail.net
 Rotterdam Metro Map at public-transport.net
 Rotterdam Metro Map at amsterdamtips.com
 Rotterdam Metro Map at metrolinemap.com

 
750 V DC railway electrification